The Stubbs Park–Stonewall Street Historic District in Dublin, Georgia is a residential area that was listed on the National Register of Historic Places in 2002. The district has been a residential neighborhood since the 1910s and is bounded by West Moore Street, Lancaster Street, Marion Street, Academy Avenue and Roosevelt Street.  The Dublin Historic Neighborhood Association was formed in 1995 to preserve and improve the neighborhood.

Houses on Bellevue Avenue

References

External links
 
 Dublin Historic Neighborhood Association
 Listing on National Register of Historic Places
 City of Dublin, Georgia
 Oconee Regional Library

Laurens County, Georgia
Victorian architecture in Georgia (U.S. state)
Historic districts on the National Register of Historic Places in Georgia (U.S. state)
National Register of Historic Places in Laurens County, Georgia